Dhabi Kalan is a village in the Bhattu Kalan block, Fatehabad District, Hisar Division in Haryana, India.Khurd and Kalan Persian language word which means small and Big respectively when two villages have same name then it is distinguished as Kalan means Big and Khurd means Small with Village Name.
Dhabi Kalan is located 7 km from its Mandal main town Bhattu Kalan and 25 km from the district headquarter Fatehabad. The Distance to Hisar is 55 km. The distance to State capital Chandigarh is 260 km. The village is situated 230  km from the national capital New Delhi.

Economy
The economy of this village depends mainly on agriculture. Dairy products are an additional source of income.

Culture
The majority of the population are Hindus (~95%), and ca. 5% are Muslims. Haryanvi, Bagri and Hindi are spoken languages in Dhabi Kalan.

Education
Dhabi Kalan has one government school and a few private ones, but most people prefer educational institutions in Bhattu Mandi or Fatehabad as they are easily accessible.

Population
The Dhabi Kalan village has population of 4617 of which 2422 are males while 2195 are females as per Population Census 2011.

See also

 List of villages in Fatehabad district

References

Development & Panchayats Department, Government of Haryana

Villages in Fatehabad district